Nazarkino is a rural locality (a selo) in Maxyutovsky Selsoviet, Kugarchinsky District, Bashkortostan, Russia. The population was 220 as of 2010. There are 5 streets.

Geography 
Nazarkino is located 53 km south of Mrakovo (the district's administrative centre) by road. Iknazarovo is the nearest rural locality.

References 

Rural localities in Kugarchinsky District